Titabar Assembly constituency is one of the 126 assembly constituencies of  Assam a north east state of India. Titabar is part of Jorhat Lok Sabha constituency.

Members of Legislative Assembly

 1951: Sarju Prasad Singh, All People's Party
 1957: Sarbeswar Bardoloi, Indian National Congress
 1962: Sarbeswar Bardoloi, Indian National Congress
 1967: D. Sarmah, Indian National Congress
 1972: Joy Chandra Bora, Indian National Congress
 1978: Giridhar Thengal, Communist Party of India
 1983: Joy Chandra Bora, Indian National Congress
 1985: Deba Kumar Bora, Independent
 1991: Mahendra Bora, Indian National Congress
 1996: Hemanta Kalita, Asom Gana Parishad
 2001: Dip Gogoi, Indian National Congress
 2001 (By Election): Tarun Gogoi, Indian National Congress
 2006: Tarun Gogoi, Indian National Congress
 2011: Tarun Gogoi, Indian National Congress
 2016: Tarun Gogoi, Indian National Congress
 2021: Bhaskar Jyoti Baruah, Indian National Congress

Election results

2016 results

2011 results

2006 results

See also

 Titabar
 List of constituencies of Assam Legislative Assembly

References

External links 
 

Assembly constituencies of Assam
Jorhat
Jorhat district